Christopher Thomas Adcock (born 27 April 1989) is a retired English badminton player. Adcock is currently sponsored by Yonex and YC Sports and plays for the University of Nottingham-based NBL team. He entered the National team in 2006, and later won the boys' doubles and mixed team titles at the 2007 European Junior Championships. He was a World Championships medalists winning a silver in 2011 with Imogen Bankier and a bronze in 2017 with Gabby Adcock. Together with Gabby, he also won a silver medal at the 2007 World Junior Championships, and then claimed the gold medals at the Commonwealth Games in 2014 and 2018; and at the European Championships in 2017 and 2018.

Chris Adcock also representing Great Britain competed at the 2012, 2016 Olympic Games and at the 2019 European Games. In the European Games, he and Gabby won the mixed doubles silver medal.

Career 
At the 2008 Thomas Cup Chris Adcock made his debut at a major senior international tournament where he played one match in the group stage. He would continue to represent England at the 2009 Sudirman Cup where the team played sixth. His world championships debut came at the 2010 BWF World Championships where he entered Mixed doubles with Gabrielle White, but lost in the first round. He later switched Mixed Doubles partners to compete with Scottish player Imogen Bankier. They had a Cinderella run at the 2011 London Worlds where they defeated three seeded pairs before losing in the final. Chris Adcock also competes in Men's Doubles, currently pairing with fellow Englishmen Andrew Ellis. Although they qualified for the Olympics, they had a disappointing performance and lost in the first round.

In October 2012, the pair announced their decision to split, with Bankier stating her intention to return to Badminton Scotland and form a Scottish partnership. Subsequently, Adcock reignited his mixed doubles partnership with White, whom he later married. They later won the BWF Super Series Masters Finals in 2015, and become the first British players to do so.

Adcock competed in the 2014 Commonwealth Games, winning gold in the mixed doubles alongside his wife. In 2015, he became the champion at the Dubai World Superseries Finals in mixed doubles event. In 2016, he competed at the Summer Olympics in the mixed doubles event, but did not advance to the knockout stage.

In October 2016, the Adcocks were the semifinalist at the Denmark Open, but they lost to home duo Joachim Fischer Nielsen and Christinna Pedersen in the straight games. The Adcocks then reaching the final at the Grand Prix Gold tournament at the 2016 Bitburger Open, defeated by the Chinese pair Zheng Siwei and Chen Qingchen with the score 16–21, 21–23. At the end of 2016 BWF Season, the Adcocks were qualified to compete at the Dubai World Superseries Finals. They advanced to the final round after placed second in the group stage, won a semifinal match against Praveen Jordan and Debby Susanto of Indonesia in three games, but they lost again to Chinese paired Zheng and Cheng.

In 2017, the Adcocks won the gold medal at the European Championships in Denmark defeating Joachim Fischer Nielsen and Christinna Pedersen in the final. They also clinched the bronze medal at the BWF World Championships in Glasgow. In 2018, he competed at the Commonwealth Games in Gold Coast, and defend the mixed doubles gold with his wife, also claimed the mixed team bronze.

In 2019, he qualified to represent Great Britain at the 2019 European Games, played in the mixed doubles with his wife. Competed as the top seeds the duo advance to the final stage, they were defeated by their compatriot Marcus Ellis and Lauren Smith in straight games 14–21, 9–21, and settle for a silver medal.

Achievements

BWF World Championships 
Mixed doubles

Commonwealth Games 
Mixed doubles

European Games 
Mixed doubles

European Championships 
Men's doubles

Mixed doubles

BWF World Junior Championships 
Mixed doubles

European Junior Championships 
Boys' doubles

BWF World Tour (3 runners-up) 
The BWF World Tour, which was announced on 19 March 2017 and implemented in 2018, is a series of elite badminton tournaments sanctioned by the Badminton World Federation (BWF). The BWF World Tour is divided into levels of World Tour Finals, Super 1000, Super 750, Super 500, Super 300, and the BWF Tour Super 100.

Mixed doubles

BWF Superseries (2 titles, 2 runners-up) 
The BWF Superseries, which was launched on 14 December 2006 and implemented in 2007, is a series of elite badminton tournaments, sanctioned by the Badminton World Federation (BWF). BWF Superseries levels are Superseries and Superseries Premier. A season of Superseries consists of twelve tournaments around the world that have been introduced since 2011. Successful players are invited to the Superseries Finals, which are held at the end of each year.

Mixed doubles

  BWF Superseries Finals tournament
  BWF Superseries Premier tournament
  BWF Superseries tournament

BWF Grand Prix (1 title, 4 runners-up) 
The BWF Grand Prix had two levels, the BWF Grand Prix and Grand Prix Gold. It was a series of badminton tournaments sanctioned by the Badminton World Federation (BWF) which was held from 2007 to 2017.

Men's doubles

Mixed doubles

  BWF Grand Prix Gold tournament
  BWF Grand Prix tournament

BWF International Challenge/Series (5 titles, 2 runners-up) 
Men's doubles

Mixed doubles

  BWF International Challenge tournament
  BWF International Series tournament

Record against selected opponents 
Mixed doubles results with Imogen Bankier against Super Series finalists, Worlds Semi-finalists, and Olympic quarterfinalists.

  Tao Jiaming & Tian Qing 1–0
  Xu Chen & Ma Jin 0–3
  Zhang Nan & Zhao Yunlei 2–5
  Chen Hung-ling & Cheng Wen-hsing 1–0
  Thomas Laybourn & Kamilla Rytter Juhl 0–1
  Michael Fuchs & Birgit Michels 0–1
  Tontowi Ahmad & Liliyana Natsir 1–3
  Shintaro Ikeda & Reiko Shiota 2–0
  Robert Mateusiak & Nadieżda Zięba 0–1
  Aleksandr Nikolaenko & Valeria Sorokina 0–1
 / Robert Blair & Gabrielle White 1–1
  Songphon Anugritayawon & Kunchala Voravichitchaikul 1–1
  Sudket Prapakamol & Saralee Thungthongkam 0–3

References

External links 

 
 
 
 
 
 
 

1989 births
Living people
Sportspeople from Leicester
English male badminton players
Badminton players at the 2012 Summer Olympics
Badminton players at the 2016 Summer Olympics
Olympic badminton players of Great Britain
Badminton players at the 2010 Commonwealth Games
Badminton players at the 2014 Commonwealth Games
Badminton players at the 2018 Commonwealth Games
Commonwealth Games gold medallists for England
Commonwealth Games silver medallists for England
Commonwealth Games bronze medallists for England
Commonwealth Games medallists in badminton
Badminton players at the 2019 European Games
European Games silver medalists for Great Britain
European Games medalists in badminton
Medallists at the 2010 Commonwealth Games
Medallists at the 2014 Commonwealth Games
Medallists at the 2018 Commonwealth Games